John James Osborne (12 December 1929 – 24 December 1994) was an English playwright, screenwriter and actor known for writing prose that criticized established social and political norms. Look Back in Anger (1956) is his best known work.

Osborne was also notorious for his violent language, not only on behalf of the political causes he supported, but also against his own family, including his wives and children. Osborne was one of the first writers to address Britain's purpose in the post-imperial age.

Early life 
Osborne was born on 12 December 1929 in London, the son of Thomas Godfrey Osborne, a commercial artist and advertising copywriter of South Welsh ancestry, and Nellie Beatrice Grove, a Cockney barmaid.

In 1935 his family moved to the north Surrey suburb of Stoneleigh, near Ewell, in search of a better life. Osborne, however, would regard it as a cultural desert – a school friend declared subsequently that "he thought [we] were a lot of dull, uninteresting people." He adored his father but hated his mother, whom he described as "hypocritical, self-absorbed, calculating and indifferent."

Thomas Osborne died in 1941, leaving the young boy an insurance settlement which he used to pay for a private education at Belmont College, a minor public school in Barnstaple that closed in the 1960s. He entered the school in 1943, but was expelled in the summer term of 1945. Osborne claimed this was for hitting the headmaster, who had struck him for listening to a broadcast by Frank Sinatra, but another former pupil asserted that Osborne was caught fighting with other pupils and did not assault the headmaster. A School Certificate was the only formal qualification he acquired.

After school, Osborne went home to his mother in London and briefly tried trade journalism. A job tutoring a touring company of junior actors introduced him to the theatre. He soon became involved as a stage manager and actor, joining Anthony Creighton's provincial touring company. Osborne tried his hand at writing plays, co-writing his first, The Devil Inside Him, with his mentor Stella Linden, who then directed it at the Theatre Royal in Huddersfield in 1950. In June 1951 Osborne married Pamela Lane. His second play Personal Enemy was written with Anthony Creighton (with whom he later wrote Epitaph for George Dillon staged at the Royal Court in 1958). Personal Enemy was staged in regional theatres before he submitted Look Back in Anger.

Look Back in Anger 
Look Back in Anger was written in 17 days in a deck chair on Morecambe pier where Osborne was performing in Hugh Hastings' play Seagulls over Sorrento in a repertory theatre. Osborne's play is largely autobiographical, based on his time living, and arguing, with Pamela Lane in cramped accommodation in Derby, while she had an affair with a local dentist. It was submitted to several agents in London, who rejected it. In his autobiography, Osborne writes: "The speed with which it had been returned was not surprising, but its aggressive dispatch did give me a kind of relief. It was like being grasped at the upper arm by a testy policeman and told to move on". Finally it was sent to the newly formed English Stage Company at London's Royal Court Theatre.

Formed by actor-manager and artistic director George Devine, the company had seen its first three productions perform poorly and urgently needed a success if it was to survive. Devine was prepared to gamble on this play because he saw in it a powerful articulation of a new post-war spirit. Osborne was living on a houseboat with Creighton at Cubitts Yacht Basin in Chiswick on the River Thames at the time and eating stewed nettles from the riverbank. In order to contact Osborne, Devine rowed out to the houseboat to tell him he would like to make the play the fourth production to enter repertory. The play was directed by Tony Richardson and starred Kenneth Haigh, Mary Ure and Alan Bates. George Fearon, a part-time press officer at the theatre, invented the phrase "angry young man". He told Osborne that he disliked the play and feared it would be impossible to market.

Reviews of Look Back in Anger were mixed. Most of the critics who attended the first night felt it was a failure, but the play later became an enormous commercial success, transferring to the West End and Broadway, and touring to Moscow. A film version was released in May 1959 with Richard Burton and Mary Ure in the leading roles. The play brought Osborne fame and won him the Evening Standard Drama Award as the most promising playwright of 1956.

During production Osborne, then married, began a relationship with (Eileen) Mary Ure, and would divorce his wife, Pamela Lane, to marry Ure in 1957. Ure died in 1975.

The Entertainer and into the 1960s 

When he first saw Look Back in Anger, Laurence Olivier had a poor opinion of the play. At the time, Olivier was making a film of Rattigan's The Prince and the Showgirl co-starring Marilyn Monroe, and she was accompanied to London by her husband Arthur Miller. Olivier asked the American dramatist what plays he might want to see in London. Based on its title, Miller suggested Osborne's work; Olivier tried to dissuade him, but the playwright was insistent and the two of them saw it together.

Miller found the play revelatory, and they went backstage to meet Osborne. Olivier was impressed by the American's reaction and asked Osborne for a part in his next play. George Devine, artistic director of the Royal Court, sent Olivier the incomplete script of The Entertainer. Olivier eventually took the central role as failing music-hall performer Archie Rice, playing successfully both at the Royal Court and in the West End.

The Entertainer uses the metaphor of the dying music hall tradition and its eclipse by early rock and roll to comment on the declining influence of the British Empire and its eclipse by the increasing influence of the United States, as illustrated during the Suez Crisis of November 1956 which forms the backdrop to the play. The Entertainer found critical acclaim.

Osborne followed The Entertainer with The World of Paul Slickey (1959) a musical that satirizes the tabloid press; the televised documentary play A Subject of Scandal and Concern (1960); and the double bill Plays for England, comprising The Blood of the Bambergs and Under Plain Cover (1962).

Luther, depicting the life of Martin Luther, was first performed in 1961; it transferred to Broadway and won Osborne a Tony Award. Inadmissible Evidence was first performed in 1964. In between these plays, Osborne won an Oscar for his 1963 screenplay adaptation of Tom Jones. His 1965 play, A Patriot for Me, draws on the Austrian Redl case, involving themes of homosexuality and espionage, and helped to end the system of theatrical censorship under the Lord Chamberlain.

Both A Patriot For Me and The Hotel in Amsterdam (1968) won Evening Standard Best Play of the Year awards. The Hotel in Amsterdam features three showbiz couples in a hotel suite, having fled a tyrannical and unpleasant movie producer, referred to as "K.L." John Heilpern asserts that "K.L." was meant to represent director and producer Tony Richardson.

1970s and later life 
John Osborne's plays in the 1970s included West of Suez, starring Ralph Richardson; 1972's A Sense of Detachment; and the play Watch It Come Down, starring Frank Finlay.

During that decade Osborne played the role of gangster Cyril Kinnear in Get Carter (1971). Later, he appeared in Tomorrow Never Comes (1978) and Flash Gordon (1980).

Throughout the 1980s Osborne took the real-life role of a Shropshire squire. He wrote a diary for The Spectator. He opened his garden to raise money for the church roof, from which he threatened to withdraw covenant-funding unless the vicar restored the Book of Common Prayer (he had returned to the Church of England in about 1974).

In the last two decades of his life, Osborne published two volumes of autobiography, A Better Class of Person (1981) and Almost a Gentleman (1991). A Better Class of Person was filmed by Thames Television in 1985, featuring Eileen Atkins and Alan Howard as his parents, and Gary Capelin and Neil McPherson as Osborne. It was nominated for the Prix Italia.

Osborne's last play was Déjàvu (1991), a sequel to Look Back in Anger. Various of his newspaper and magazine writings appeared in a collection entitled Damn You, England (1994), while his two autobiographical volumes were reissued as Looking Back – Never Explain, Never Apologise (1999).

Critical responses, idols and effect 
Osborne was a great fan of Max Miller and saw parallels between them. 'I love him (Max Miller), because he embodied a kind of theatre I admire most. 'Mary from the Dairy' was an overture to the danger that (Max) might go too far. Whenever anyone tells me that a scene or a line in a play of mine goes too far in some way then I know my instinct has been functioning as it should. When such people tell you that a particular passage makes the audience uneasy or restless, then they seem (to me) as cautious and absurd as landladies and girls-who-won't.'

Osborne's work transformed British theatre. He helped to make it artistically respected again, throwing off the formal constraints of the former generation, and turning our attention once more to language, theatrical rhetoric, and emotional intensity. He saw theatre as a weapon with which ordinary people could break down the class barriers and that he had a 'beholden duty to kick against the pricks'. He wanted his plays to be a reminder of real pleasures and real pains. David Hare said in his memorial address:

Osborne did change the world of theatre, influencing playwrights such as Edward Albee and Mike Leigh. However, work of his kind of authenticity and originality would remain the exception rather than the rule. This did not surprise Osborne; nobody understood the tackiness of the theatre better than the man who had played Hamlet on Hayling Island. He was awarded a Lifetime Achievement Award from the Writer's Guild of Great Britain.

Politics 
Osborne joined the Campaign for Nuclear Disarmament in 1959. Later he drifted to the libertarian, unorganized right, considering himself "a radical who hates change".

Personal life

Relationships 
Osborne had many affairs and frequently mistreated his wives and lovers. He was married five times, all (except the last) being unhappy unions. He outlived three of his wives, being survived only by the first and the last, both of whom have since died.

Pamela Lane (1951–57) 
In Volume 1 of his autobiography A Better Class of Person, Osborne describes feeling an immediate and intense attraction towards his first wife, Pamela Lane. The pair were both members of an acting troupe in Bridgwater.

Though Alison Porter in Look Back in Anger was based on Pamela, Osborne describes Lane's respectable middle-class parents – her father a successful draper, her mother of a family of minor rural gentry as "much coarser", and how at one point they hired a private detective to follow him after a fellow actor was seen 'fumbling' with his knee in a tea shop.

Lane and Osborne married in secret in nearby Wells and then left Bridgwater the following Sunday amidst an uneasy truce with Lane's parents (Osborne's hated mother was not aware of the union until the couple were divorcing), spending their first night as a married couple together in the Cromwell Road in London.

The two lived a fairly itinerant and reasonably happy married existence at first, living at a number of places around London and finding work there at first, then touring, staying in Kidderminster in Osborne's case. While Lane's acting career flourished in Derby, Osborne's struggled, and she began an affair with a rich dentist in the summer of 1955.

Osborne spent much of the next two years before their divorce hoping they would reconcile. In 1956, after the opening of Look Back in Anger, Osborne met Lane at the railway station in York, where she told Osborne of her recent abortion and enquired after his relationship with Mary Ure. In April 1957, Osborne was granted a divorce from Lane, on the grounds of his adultery. It later emerged that in the 1980s, Lane and Osborne corresponded frequently and met in secret until he became angered by her request for a loan.

Mary Ure (1957–1963) 
Osborne began a relationship with Ure shortly after meeting her when she was cast as Alison in Look Back in Anger in 1956, while he was married to Pamela Lane. The affair swiftly progressed; and the two moved in together in Woodfall Road, Chelsea, London. He wrote later:

Eventually, Osborne became jealous and somewhat contemptuous of Ure's stable family background and her relationship with them. He also began to lose regard for her acting abilities.

There was infidelity on both sides; and, after an affair with Robert Webber, Ure eventually left Osborne for the actor and novelist Robert Shaw.

Osborne described visiting her after she had left him and having sex with her while she was pregnant with the first of four children she would bear to Shaw. Of their divorce, Osborne wrote of being surprised that she repeatedly refused to return to him treasured postcards drawn for him by his father but is circumspect at her suicide in 1975.

This is in marked contrast to his later reveling in the suicide of fourth wife Jill Bennett.

Penelope Gilliatt (1963–68) 
Osborne met his third wife, writer Penelope Gilliatt, initially through social connections, and then through an interview she conducted with him.

From Osborne's autobiography Almost a Gentleman:

One main attraction Penelope held for Osborne was her red hair: "I took red hair to be the mantle of goddesses". Despite her being married and Osborne knowing her husband, Gilliatt set out to seduce Osborne and succeeded in doing so. "Penelope's behaviour and my own during the weeks that followed were probably grotesquely indefensible", he wrote.

Osborne and Gilliatt were together for seven years, five of which they spent married, and became the parents of his only natural daughter, Nolan. Osborne had an abusive relationship with his daughter and cast her out of his house when she was 17; they never spoke again. Osborne and Gilliatt's marriage suffered through what Osborne perceived to be an unnecessary obsession on her part with her work, writing film reviews for The Observer. "I tried to point out that it seemed an inordinate amount of time and effort to expend on a thousand-word review to be read by a few thousand film addicts and forgotten almost at once." Osborne wanted Gilliatt to give up her multiple careers and move with him to a country house where she would tend his needs, including his growing alcoholism. Osborne had put a refrigerator in the couple's bedroom and filled it with champagne to alleviate his night terrors. Both began to have struggles with alcoholism.

He treated with contempt what he saw as Gilliatt's growing pretentiousness. "She was to become increasingly obsessed with fripperies and titles … She took to calling herself 'Professor Gilliatt'." Strains in the marriage, exacerbated by Gilliatt's alcoholism and Osborne's disdain of her, led to Osborne conducting numerous affairs behind her back, including one with his future wife, Jill Bennett. He could not cope with her decision to not give up her professional life to take care of him.

Jill Bennett (1968–1977) 
Osborne had a turbulent nine-year marriage to the actress Jill Bennett. Their marriage degenerated into mutual abuse with Bennett insulting Osborne, calling him "impotent" and "homosexual" in public as early as 1971. Osborne showed similar cruelty towards her. Bennett's suicide in 1990 is generally believed to have been a result of Osborne's treatment of her. He said of Bennett, "She was the most evil woman I have come across", and showed open contempt for her suicide.

He concluded by stating that his only regret that he could not "look down upon her open coffin and, like that bird in the Book of Tobit, drop a good, large mess in her eye."

Helen Dawson (1978–1994) 
Helen Dawson (1939–2004) was a former arts journalist and critic for The Observer. This final marriage of Osborne's, which lasted until his death, seems to have been happier than any of his prior marriages. Until her death in 2004, Dawson worked to preserve and promote Osborne's legacy.

Osborne died deeply in debt; his final word to Dawson was: "Sorry". After her death in 2004, Dawson was buried next to Osborne.

Vegetarianism 

Around the time of Look Back in Anger, Osborne was a vegetarian, something which was considered unusual at the time. In Almost a Gentleman he gives some insight into this lifestyle choice:

Death 
After a serious liver crisis in 1987, Osborne became diabetic, injecting insulin twice a day. He died in 1994 from complications from his diabetes at the age of 65 at his home in Clunton, near Craven Arms, Shropshire.
He is buried in St George's churchyard, Clun, Shropshire.  His last wife, Helen Dawson, who died in 2004, is buried next to him.

Archive 
Osborne began placing his papers at the Harry Ransom Center at the University of Texas in Austin in the 1960s, with additions made throughout his life and by relatives in the years after his death. The primary archive is over 50 boxes and includes typescripts and manuscripts for all of his works, correspondence, newspaper and magazine articles, scrapbooks, posters, programmes, and business documents.

In 2008, the Ransom Center purchased an additional archive of over 30 boxes that had been held by Helen Dawson Osborne. While largely focusing on the latter years of Osborne's life, the collection also includes a series of notebooks that he had kept separately from his original archive.

Works

Filmography

Notes

References 

 
 
 
 
 Doollee.com

External links 
 Parliament & the 1960s - 1966 Theatre Censorship Committee - UK Parliament Living Heritage
 John Osborne Papers at the Harry Ransom Center
 John Osborne and Helen Dawson Osborne Collection at the Harry Ransom Center
 Select Papers of the English Stage Company at the University of Leeds
 
 
 'A Poor Jonah': John Osborne's Roads to Freedom describing the discovery of John Osborne's pre-Look Back in Anger plays at the British Library
 

1929 births
1994 deaths
20th-century English dramatists and playwrights
20th-century English male writers
English male dramatists and playwrights
English people of Welsh descent
Best British Screenplay BAFTA Award winners
Best Adapted Screenplay Academy Award winners
Deaths from diabetes
English Anglicans
British male screenwriters
People from Epsom and Ewell (district)
People from Fulham
20th-century British screenwriters
People from Chiswick